In mathematics, more specifically in point-set topology, the derived set of a subset  of a topological space is the set of all limit points of  It is usually denoted by  

The concept was first introduced by Georg Cantor in 1872 and he developed set theory in large part to study derived sets on the real line.

Definition

Examples

If  is endowed with its usual Euclidean topology then the derived set of the half-open interval  is the closed interval  

Consider  with the topology (open sets) consisting of the empty set and any subset of  that contains 1.

Properties

 
  implies 
 
  implies 

A subset  of a topological space is closed precisely when  that is, when  contains all its limit points.

The derived set of a subset of a space  need not be closed in general.  For example, if  with the trivial topology, the set  has derived set  which is not closed in   But the derived set of a closed set is always closed. 

A bijection between two topological spaces is a homeomorphism if and only if the derived set of the image (in the second space) of any subset of the first space is the image of the derived set of that subset.

A space is a T1 space if every subset consisting of a single point is closed. In a T1 space, the derived set of a set consisting of a single element is empty (Example 2 above is not a T1 space). It follows that in T1 spaces, the derived set of any finite set is empty and furthermore,

for any subset  and any point  of the space. In other words, the derived set is not changed by adding to or removing from the given set a finite number of points. It can also be shown that in a T1 space,  for any subset 

Equivalently, a perfect set is a closed dense-in-itself set, or, put another way, a closed set with no isolated points. Perfect sets are particularly important in applications of the Baire category theorem.

The Cantor–Bendixson theorem states that any Polish space can be written as the union of a countable set and a perfect set.  Because any Gδ subset of a Polish space is again a Polish space, the theorem also shows that any Gδ subset of a Polish space is the union of a countable set and a set that is perfect with respect to the induced topology.

Topology in terms of derived sets

Because homeomorphisms can be described entirely in terms of derived sets, derived sets have been used as the primitive notion in topology.

 
 
  implies 
 
  implies 

Cantor–Bendixson rank

For ordinal numbers  the -th  of a topological space is defined by repeatedly applying the derived set operation using transfinite recursion as follows:

 for limit ordinals  
The transfinite sequence of Cantor–Bendixson derivatives of  must eventually be constant.

This investigations into the derivation process was one of the motivations for introducing ordinal numbers by Georg Cantor.

See also

Notes

Proofs

References

Further reading

 
 Sierpiński, Wacław F.; translated by Krieger, C. Cecilia (1952). General Topology. University of Toronto Press.

External links
 PlanetMath's article on the Cantor–Bendixson derivative

General topology